The 1942 Pensacola Naval Air Station Goslings football team represented the Pensacola Naval Air Station during the 1942 college football season. The team compiled a 3–5–1 record and was ranked No. 8 among the service teams in a poll of 91 sports writers conducted by the Associated Press.

The team's head coach was George Clark. Notable players included George Sauer, Rep Whalen, Ben McLeod, Jim Birr, and Don Clawson.

Schedule

References

Pensacola Naval Air Station
Pensacola Naval Air Station Goslings football
 Pensacola Naval Air Station Goslings football